The  was a field army of the Imperial Japanese Army during the closing stages of World War II.

History
It was transferred to the newly formed Japanese Second General Army on April 8, 1945. The Japanese 15th Area Army was responsible for the Kansai and Chugoku regions of Honshū and the island of Shikoku. It was headquartered in Osaka. The 15th Area Army leadership also held equivalent posts in the Central District Army, and had the honor of receiving their appointments personally from Emperor Hirohito rather than the Imperial General Headquarters.

The 15th Area Army consisted mostly of poorly trained reservists, conscripted students and home guard militia. In addition, the Japanese had organized the Patriotic Citizens Fighting Corps — which included all healthy men aged 15–60 and women 17–40 — to perform combat support, and ultimately combat jobs.  Weapons, training, and uniforms were generally lacking: some men were armed with nothing better than muzzle-loading muskets, longbows, or bamboo spears; nevertheless, they were expected to make do with what they had.

The 15th Area Army was demobilized at the surrender of Japan on August 15, 1945 without having seen combat.

List of Commanders

Commanding officer

Chief of Staff

References

Books

External links

Notes 

15
Military units and formations established in 1945
Military units and formations disestablished in 1945